Mara Corporation is a multi-sector business services company. It operates in the technology, financial services, manufacturing, real estate and agriculture industries.

The company was founded by Ashish J. Thakkar in 1996, and is now active in 24 countries and employs more than 11,000 people. It is headquartered in Dubai, United Arab Emirates.

Description
Mara was founded by Ashish J. Thakkar, in 1996. The company grew into an international multi-sector business, with operations and interests across 24 countries including 22 in Africa. In 2010 Mara Group was selected by the World Economic Forum as a Global Growth Company. The company is active in 22 countries and, through its investments and operations, employs more than 11,000 people.

The Mara Foundation was founded in 2009 and is the company's social enterprise project.  It provides African entrepreneurs with resources for online mentor-ship, business incubation and funding.

Mara Phones
Mara Phones part of the Mara Corporation launched smartphone factories on the African Continent in October 2019.  Kigali, Rwanda was the inaugural location for the Mara Phones manufacturing facility and Durban, South Africa opened shortly after.

Mara Phones has launched two models, the Mara X and Mara Z.

Mara Phones Lab
Mara Phones Lab is the technology arm of Mara Phones.

References

Conglomerate companies of the United Arab Emirates
Companies based in Dubai
Financial services companies established in 1996